Tourism in Pristina attracted 36,186 foreign visitors in 2012, which represents 74.2% of all visitors that visited Kosovo during that year. Foreign visitors mostly come from countries like Albania, Turkey, Germany, United States, Slovenia and North Macedonia, but also from other countries. Some of the most visited places in Pristina are Batlava Lake and Gadime Marble Cave, which are also among the most visited places in Kosovo.

Pristina is the first touristic destination in Kosovo and the main air gateway to Kosovo. The number of foreign visitors that have visited Prishtina during 2012 grew by more than 10 thousand visitors since 2008, when there were 25,434 visitors. During the first quarter of 2013 the number of hotels in Prishtina was 24 from 102 hotels that were in total in Kosovo and during the third quarter of the year 2013, 18.85% of hotel capacity were used and during the same period of that year, in Prishtina 423 rooms were with one bed, 268 rooms with two beds, 13 rooms with three beds, 49 apartments and 6 residents.

Since 2009, Kosovo Tourism Association organizes an annual Tourism Fair in Pristina, which is intended to attract foreign visitors to Kosovo. In the International Tourism Fair held in Tokyo, Japan, in 2013, 4 day packages have been presented that a tourist from Asia can enjoy in Kosovo, starting from Pristina, then continuing in Peja, Gjakova and concluding in Prizren.

Pristina is a place that is known as a university center of students from regional countries like Albania, Macedonia, Montenegro and Serbia  and it represents a plateau of the combination of native, Ottoman and Yugoslav culture. Its people are people that are known for hospitality and religious tolerance, where people in the city are mostly Muslims, but there are also Catholics, Orthodoxes, Atheists and people of other religions. Around 23% of the people belong the group age of 16-27, who are also very optimistic.

Pristina has played a very important role during the World War II, being a shelter for Jews, whose cemeteries now can be visited.

Coffee bars are a representative icon of Prishtina and they can be found almost everywhere and are also centers of different festivals and events. In the region of Prishtina there is Gracanica monastery, which is in the list of UNESCO World Heritage Sites.

Statistics

The table below shows the number of national and international visitors and the number of nights spent in Prishtina from 2008 until 2012. As it can be seen from the table, one of the most successful year for tourism in Prishtina was the year 2012.

Issues affecting tourism

Tourism is showing some positive indications that it is improving in Kosovo and also in Pristina.

Museums

National Museum of Kosovo has a collection of more than 50 thousand exhibits of different profiles, from archaeology, technology, history, nature, entoculture, folklore, heritage and almost everything that shows the history of Kosovo in different times, from the Neolithic era, 6 thousand years BC, until today. The Kosovo Museum has an extensive collection of archaeological and ethnological artifacts, including the Neolithic Goddess on the Throne terracotta, found near Pristina in 1956 and depicted in the city's emblem. A large number of artifacts from antiquity are still in Belgrade, and the museum was looted in 1999.
The Ethnological Museum Emin Gjiku is an integral part of the National Museum of Kosovo in Prishtina, located in the old housing complex, consisting of four buildings, two of which date from the eighteenth century and two others from the nineteenth century. The concept of the Ethnological Museum is based on four topics which represent the life cycle including birth, life, death and spiritual heritage. The Stone House is also a part of the museum which today serves as a center of contemporary art – station.

Ottoman Prishtina

A very large part of the city of Prishtina has a lot of oriental elements, including causeway roads, many mosques, bazars and The Memorial Monument of Gazimestan. Some of the mosques are King Mosque, built during the years 1460–1461 from Sulltan Mehmet II al Fatih, Jashar Pasha Mosque and Çarshia Mosque.

Çarshia Mosque is a building of the old Prishtina, that has been built in the fifteenth century from Sulltan Bajaziti in order to remember the victory of Ottomans in 1389. In the past, Çarshia Mosque was placed in front of Prishtina's covered bazar. Today there is nothing left from the old bazar, only the name of the mosque helps us remember it. A lot of alterations and workings in order to improve it have changed the original appearance of this mosque, but its symbols, bricks of the top of minares have survived for more than 600 years. This mosque today is in front of the Museum of Kosovo. Minare of Çarshia Mosque is unique in Europe, because its top is built with bricks instead of aluminum. Near this mosque there is the shadervan decorated with marble, which is the only public shadervan in Prishtina which has survived. Near Çarshia Mosque there is the Clock Tower, which dates back to the ninetieth century, which has the shape of a hexagon and it is 26 meters high.

The Jashar Pasha Mosque was built in the sixteenth century and it is located next to the Çarshia Mosque. According to the inscription that was found in the mosque, it was finished in 1834  and the mosque has a very unusual characteristic, where The Star of David can be seen in one of the mosque’s windows as it can be seen in the picture.
Sulltan Murati Shrine is placed in Mazgit village, 7 kilometers in the west side of Prishtina. Symbolically it denotes the place where Sulltan Murati was killed in the Battle of Kosovo in 1389.

In Prishtina there is the Big Bazar which today is a very active zone in the city of Prishtina, although a large part of it has been destroyed in years 1950s, which still has the same style of a lot of other bazars that can be found in Balkan.

Yugoslav Prishtina

Prishtina was impacted from Yugoslavia because it was part of Yugoslav Federation for a few decades, taking elements of The Yugoslav Style, where such buildings can be seen even today.

University of Pristina is a public higher education institution located in Pristina, Kosovo. It comprises 14 faculties located in Prishtina and three branches in other cities of Kosovo. The University of Pristina is an Albanian-language higher education institution, emerged after the Kosovo War. It occupies the campus in Prishtina, Kosovo, serving as the major university in the area of Kosovo.
National Library of Kosovo is the highest library institution in Kosovo. It was founded from Kosovo Parliament and its main intention was collecting and conserving intellectual heritage of Kosovo and for Kosovo. Its collections are a very precious treasure of national, regional and world heritage. From the year 1999, this central library institution of Kosovo is known with the name: National and University Library of Kosovo, by functioning as a center of library information in national level, that collects, refines and conserves library materials that have an important role in culture, art and science.

National Art Gallery of Kosovo was founded in 1979 as a cultural institution to present visual art and collect valuable works. More than 500 exhibitions have been organized by this institute. The gallery also encourages young artists by organizing exhibitions showing the work of these young artists. The National Art Gallery of Kosovo is located in the University of Prishtina's campus right after the National and University Library of Kosovo. The building was used by the National Museum of Kosovo.
The Monument of Unity and Brotherhood has three 15 meters high columns, that symbolizes the union and brotherhood (a favorite Yugoslav slogan) of three nationalities in Kosovo (Albanians, Serbs and Montenegrins). In the basement of the columns the inscription 1961 can be seen, which most probably marks the year of foundation of this monument.
Boro Ramiz is a Youth and Sport Palace, that served as a perfect example to reflect on the planning manner in the Yugoslav era, where there were discos, concert and sport halls, but today it has been transformed more in a trading center, where there can be found different shops, and also a basketball field, which is the area where the basketball team of the city holds its training sessions.
Hivzi Sylejmani Library is a city library that was founded in the year 1930. It became famous from the ex-executive of Regional Committee of Communist Party of Kosovo, Miladin Popoviq. In the year 1948, this building became a library of the city of Prishtina.

Parks
Prishtina has a number of parks like The City Park, Taukbahqe Park, Arberia Park, and the most known, Germia National Park. Germia is a rich place of flora and fauna, with more than 75 percent of its territory covered with forests and its highest point is 1,050 meters above the sea level. It has some sport fields, walking and biking paths, some restaurants and a lake-sized swimming pool.

Other sites

The Newborn monument (stylized NEWBORN) is a typographic sculpture and tourist attraction in Prishtina, Kosovo, unveiled on the 17 February 2008, the day that Kosovo declared independence from Serbia. The monument consists of the English-language word "Newborn" in capital block letters, which were painted bright yellow when the sculpture was first revealed. The monument was re-painted with the flags of the states that have recognized Kosovo as an independent country. Newborn will be painted differently and unveiled on 17 February every year. The monument has attracted the attention of international media reporting Kosovo's declaration of independence, and it was featured prominently on the front page of The New York Times. The monument has won prizes in six major international competitions in design category. Silver Clio Award was awarded at the 49th Clio Awards Festival for motivating human behavior in significant ways, the prestigious Cannes Gold Lion was awarded at the 55th Annual Cannes Lions International Advertising Festival, Eurobest European Advertising Festival Silver Award, Golden Drum Grand Prix and LIA (London International Awards) finalist, all awarded in 2008, and The One Club Merit Award awarded in 2009. The re-painting of the monument was a selected finalist at the 54th Clio Awards Festival in 2013. The design work has also been used in books to illustrate the design process and project concept development, as well as the use of FF DIN Typeface.
Archaeological Park in Prishtina is placed in front of the Museum of Kosovo. Together with Ethnological Museum it is part of the “Follow the yellow line” project, that is intended to represent the Cultural Heritage of Prishtina.

The Cathedral of Blessed Mother Teresa in Prishtina  is a Roman Catholic cathedral. In 2007 the Government of Kosovo approved plans for the building. The church's foundation was ceremonially laid by former Kosovo president Ibrahim Rugova. It is dedicated to the Nobel Prize winner, Blessed Mother Teresa.
Gadime Marble Cave is located 20 kilometers from the city of Prishtina. It is 1,276 meters in length and the volcanic lava and tufa accumulation on the marble dates back to the time of the formation of the Kosovo Valley.
The Skanderbeg monument, also known as Gjergj Kastrioti Skenderbeu, was built where The Mother Teresa and Skanderbeg bulevard meet, in the center of Prishtina, which is a tribute to the Albanian hero who fought off the Ottomas in the fifteenth century. The statue was designed by Albanian artist Janaq Paco in 2001.

Events and Festivals
Prishtina is a place where a lot and different events and festivals take place, that attract a lot of both national, and international visitors.
KosICT is one of the biggest events of Information and Communications Technology in Kosovo, which had its first version held in the year 2012. It is organized by STIKK (Kosovo Association of Information and Communications Technology) and each year it intends to cover the global trending topics of ICT by gathering local, regional and international speakers.
Software Freedom Kosova, which for the first time was held in the year 2009, is one of the biggest events both in Kosovo and in the region about promoting the free and open source software. It is an annual event, which gathers speakers and a lot of attendees from Kosovo, region and other places.

Startup Weekend Prishtina is an annual event, that lasts for 54 hours straight, that gathers people that are inspired and have an idea about a service or a product which could be a base of the development of a future business.
Prishtina Jazz Festival is a jazz music festival, which was initiated from Ilir Bajri in the year 2005 and it takes place during November in Oda Theater. A lot of jazz musicians from different places of the world have attended this event.
The Prishtina International Film Festival (PriFilmFest), also known as the Pristina Film Festival, is a film festival held annually in Prishtina, Kosovo, that screens prominent international cinema productions in the Balkan region, and draws attention to the Kosovar film industry. It was created after the 2008 Kosovo declaration of independence. The first festival was held in 2009, and featured actress Vanessa Redgrave as the host

International Festival of Young Musicians - DAM (IFOYMD) is the first one of this kind that has been organized in Kosovo. Now it has become traditional. The first edition of the festival was held in April 2006 and had presented musicians from Kosovo (then part of Serbia and Montenegro), Italy, Germany, Albania and Slovenia, while in the second edition this festival grew as a remarkable event by bringing and presenting musicians from Ukraine, Egypt, Austria, Great Britain, Albania, Bulgaria, Croatia and Kosovo.
Skena UP is an international film festival of film and theater students, that takes place every year, where theater and film shows, workshops and discussions that are held during this event are intended to create an appropriate forum for presenting the work of students, where students are able to meet with the audience and get their opinions,.
911 Festival is a festival of short movies, that last 5–30 minutes, that are offered by local directors, and the international attendees in this festival can understand the films from English subtitles that are shown.

Traditional food
The best known of all and most distinctive one, flija, is prepared year-round but is a summer favourite. Flija made with saç is a specialty from the traditional Albanian cuisine, that is mostly prepared in mountainous areas. It is most certainly one of the typical Kosovar dishes that everyone local will recommend. Baklava is one of the traditional pastries of the Kosovar cuisine, although of Turkish origin. Bakllasarem is also a traditional food of Kosovo it is a salty pie with yoghurt and garlic covering.

Nightlife
Prishtina has a small area, but with a lot of coffee bars, that are near each other. Nightlife amazes the foreign visitors and it is mainly concentrated in the Mother Teresa boulevard, Fehmi Agani road and Pejton neighborhood. Past Korza where the youth walked in the Mother Teresa boulevard has already been replaced with night clubs, discos and different coffee bars, where Hamam Bar, that offers life jazz music, has entered among the top five bar restaurants with the best enteriour design in the world.

Cultural Heritage
Prishtina has been inhabited for nearly 10,000d years, and for this reason, it has a rich cultural heritage.

Harilaqi Castle that is placed in Harilaq village, that is 20 kilometers to the west of Prishtina, is identified with Aria Castle, that has been built in the sixth century from Justinian Emperor. It is above a hill of Galesh Mountains, from which Kosovo Valley can be seen as in the palm of the hand. The Castle has been built in the fourth century. Besides late and medieval ancient artifacts, in the castle are also some sporadic foundings from Eneolithic, Bronze and Dardan periods of iron.

Ulpiana was an ancient Roman city located in what is today Kosovo. It was also named Justiniana Secunda. Ulpiana lies in a fertile land, near the left bank of the river Gracanica where nearby there is a mine which has been used since Roman times. These days you can find the ruins of the city around 9 km in the south-east of Pristina and it includes the municipality of Laplje Selo.   In 1955, under Resolution No.v.E.K.21/55, Ulpiana was added to the Archaeological Sites of Exceptional Importance list. Because it is located on the left side of the river in Gracanica, it is considered as a fertile land, near there is a mine which was used in Roman times and had a great role on the development of the most important cities on the Roman province of Dardania.
Gracanica is a Serbian Orthodox monastery located in Kosovo. It was founded by the Serbian king Stefan Milutin in 1321. Gracanica Monastery was declared Monument of Culture of Exceptional Importance in 1990, and it is protected by Republic of Serbia, and on 13 July 2006 it was placed on UNESCO's World Heritage List under the name of Medieval Monuments in Kosovo as an extension of the Visoki Dečani site which was overall placed on the List of World Heritage in Danger.

Gallery

References

External links
'Experience Kosovo: Pristina Guide
Prishtina travel guide
'Pristina In Your Pocket' online city guide
Tourism in Kosovo
Kosovo Guide
Kosovo, the Young Europeans
'Stigs Guide to Pristina' online city guide